Michael Ian Baxter (born 1945), is a male retired international athlete and current coach.

Athletics career
Baxter finished fourth in the 1968 AAA Championships and finished runner-up in the 1969 Northern cross-country. He trained with Brendan Foster and was selected for Great Britain’s team for the 1969 European Athletics Championships in Athens, and the 1971 European Athletics Championships in Helsinki.
He represented England in the 5,000 metres, at the 1970 British Commonwealth Games in Edinburgh, Scotland.

His best year came in 1971 when he became AAA National 5000m champion and competed in the 1971 European Athletics Championships. He was a member of the Leeds City Club.

Coaching
Since retiring from competitive racing he has coached athletes.

References

1941 births
English male cross country runners
Athletes (track and field) at the 1970 British Commonwealth Games
Living people
Commonwealth Games competitors for England